Kaiwan Wattanakrai (8 April 1951 – 28 June 2022) was a Thai voice actor who appeared in various Thai dubbed versions of Japanese anime and tokusatsu, working for MCOT HD and Dream Express (DEX). He was regarded as one of the most important pioneers of the Thai voice acting industry and was credited with popularizing Thai-dubbed anime throughout Thailand in the 1980s and 1990s. His major roles include Master Roshi in Dragon Ball, Vegeta in Dragon Ball Z, Roronoa Zoro in One Piece and Juzo Megure and Heiji Hattori in Detective Conan. Kaiwan was known for his distinctive voice and strong Suphan Buri accent.

Filmography

Voice over roles

Anime
 Dragon Ball – Master Roshi
 Dragon Ball Z – Master Roshi, Vegeta, Cell
 Mobile Suit Gundam Wing – Duo Maxwell
 Tokyo Babylon (Channel 9 dub) – Seishirō Sakurazuka
 Saint Seiya (Channel 9 dub) – Cygnus Hyoga, Phoenix Ikki
 Saint Seiya: Hades Chapter (Channel 9 dub) – Cygnus Hyoga, Phoenix Ikki, Libra Dogo, Gemini Saga
 Saint Seiya: The Lost Canvas (Channel 9 dub) – Libra Dogo, Pope Sage
 Revolutionary Girl Utena – Touga Kiryuu
 Kinnikuman(Channel 9 dub) – Terryman, Buffaloman
 Mirmo! (Channel 9 dub) – Hirai, Dark
 Ghost Sweeper Mikami (Channel 9 dub) – Doctor Chaos, Kazuhiro Karasu
 Sailor Moon (Channel 9 dub) – Professor Tomoe, Motoki Furuhata, Zoisite, Ail
 Ranma ½ (Channel 9 dub) – Happosai, Dr. Tofu Ono
 Yu Yu Hakusho (Channel 9 dub) – Hiei, Rando, Suzaku, Sakyo, Kuronue, Raizen
 Slam Dunk (Channel 9 dub) – Mito Yohe, Miyagi Ryota
 Fighting Spirit (Channel 9 dub) – Masaru Aoki, Takeshi Sendō
 Magic Knight Rayearth (Channel 9 dub) – Inouva
 Detective Conan – Megure Juzo, Supporting character
 Fist of the North Star – Raoh and supporting characters
 Yaiba – Tsukikage, Kumo-Otoko, Kotaro Fuma
 The Prince of Tennis – Kaidou Kaoru, Oishi Syuichirou
 Inazuma Eleven – Ryūgo Someoka
 Inuyasha – Koga, Ogunima, Myoga
 Shōnen Onmyōji – Guren
 Fairy Tail – Makarov Dreyar
 Zatch Bell! – Apollo, Brago
 Mobile Suit Gundam – Char Aznable 
 Mobile Suit Zeta Gundam – Char Aznable/Quattro Bajeena
 Mobile Suit Gundam SEED – Rau Le Creuset, Dearka Elsman
 Mobile Suit Gundam SEED Destiny – Gilbert Durandal, Sting Oakley
 Mobile Suit Gundam 00 – Graham Aker, Johann Trinity, Ian Vashti, Andrei Smirnov
 Mobile Suit Gundam: Iron-Blooded Orphans – Nadi Yukinojo Kassapa, Naze Turbine, Chad Chadan
 Fighting Spirit – Ichirō Miyata, Genji Kamogawa, Masaru Aoki, Takeshi Sendō
 Detective Conan – Megure Juzo, Gin, Hattori Heiji, Supporting character
 Fullmetal Alchemist – Maes Hughes
 Kannazuki no Miko – Tsubasa, Yukihito
 Shin Mazinger Shougeki! Z Hen – Juzo Kabuto, Count Brocken, Boss
 Yakitate Japan – Ken Matsushiro
 City Hunter – Saeba Ryo
 Kinnikuman Nisei – Terry the Kid, Checkmate
 Inuyasha – Sesshomaru, Bankotsu, Myoga, Hakkaku
 Code Geass – Charles zi Britannia, General Bartley Asprius, Kyoshiro Tohdoh, Kanon Maldini, Yoshitaka Minami, Kanon Maldini, Luciano Bradley
 Slamdunk – Sakuragi Hanamichi
 Fate/stay night – Archer, Gilgamesh
 Digimon Savers – Satsuma Rentarou
 Nadia: The Secret of Blue Water – Gargoyle, Hanson
 Fruits Basket – Hatori Sohma
 Tokyo Mew Mew – Ryou Shirogane, Kish
 Cyborg Kuro-chan - Narrator, Grandpa Fuji, Romeo, Hirosue
 One Piece Roronoa Zoro, supporting characters
 Great Teacher Onizuka – Yoshito Kikuchi, Hiroshi Uchiyamada
 Gintama – Hijikata Toshiro
 Tiger & Bunny – Keith Goodman/Sky High, Yuri Petrov/Lunatic, Ben Jackson  
 Saint Seiya – Phoenix Ikki, Libra Dohko, Sagittarius Aiolos, Unicorn Jabu, Lizard Misty
 Sgt. Frog – Sergeant Major Kululu (Ep. 206–358)

Tokusatsu dubbing
 Juukou B-Fighter as Daisaku Katagiri
 B-Fighter Kabuto as Masaru Osanai, Julio Rivera
 Madan Senki Ryukendo as Juushirou Fudou
 Ultraman as Shin Hayata
 Ultraman Taro as Shuuhei Aragaki, Yutaro Asahina, Narrator
 Ultraman Leo as Gen Otori, Narrator
 Ultraman Gaia as Gamu Takayama
 Ultraman Max as Ultraman Max, Kenzo Tomioka
 Kamen Rider as Takeshi Hongo
 Kamen Rider Kabuto as Sou Yaguruma, Tsurugi Kamishiro
 Kamen Rider Den-O as Yuto Sakurai, Kintaros, Owner
 Kamen Rider Kiva as Taiga Nobori, Mamoru Shima
 Kamen Rider W as Ryu Terui, Kirihiko Sudo
 Kamen Rider OOO as Maki Kiyoto, Gamel
 Kamen Rider Fourze as Mitsuaki Gamou, Shun Daimonji
 Kamen Rider Wizard as Wiseman
 Kamen Rider Gaim as Oren Pierre Alfonzo, DJ Sagara
 Kamen Rider Drive as Brain Roidmude
 Kamen Rider Ex-Aid as Kiriya Kujo, Masamune Dan

Live-action roles 
Sam Chuk (2009)
Baan Phee Phop Reformation (2011)

References

1951 births
2022 deaths
Kaiwan Wattanakrai
Kaiwan Wattanakrai
Kaiwan Wattanakrai
Kaiwan Wattanakrai
Kaiwan Wattanakrai
Deaths from liver failure